Twilight of the Gods may refer to:

Ragnarök, in Norse mythology, a series of major events foretold to result in the death of a number of gods

Music 
 Twilight of the Gods (opera) (Götterdämmerung), the last of the four operas by Richard Wagner that make up The Ring of the Nibelung
 Twilight of the Gods (album), a 1991 album by Bathory
 Twilight of the Gods, a Bathory tribute band and supergroup, fronted by Alan Averill
 "Twilight of the Gods", a song by Helloween from Keeper of the Seven Keys Part 1
 "Twilight of the Gods" (Blind Guardian song), a 2014 song and a single by Blind Guardian from Beyond the Red Mirror
 "Twilight of the Gods", a song by Virgin Steele from The Marriage of Heaven and Hell Part II

Literature 
 Twilight of the Gods (Clapham and Miller novel), a novel by Mark Clapham and Jon de Burgh Miller from the Virgin New Adventures
 Twilight of the Gods (Bulis novel), an original novel written by Christopher Bulis
 Twilight of the Gods (Hamilton collection), a collection of short stories by Edmond Hamilton
 The Twilight of the Gods and Other Tales, a collection of short stories by Richard Garnett
 Twilight of the Gods, a book about The Beatles by Wilfrid Mellers
 Twilight of the Gods: War in the Western Pacific, 1944-1945, third book in a nonfiction trilogy about the Pacific War by Ian W. Toll

Television and film 
 "Twilight of the Gods" (Inspector Morse), an episode of Inspector Morse
 Twilight of the Gods, a 1995 short starring Marton Csokas
 Twilight of the Gods, an upcoming Norse mythology-inspired animated series by Zack Snyder

See also
 "The Twilight of the Grey Gods", a 1962 short story by Robert E. Howard
 The Twilight of the Golds, a 1993 play by Jonathan Tolins
 The Twilight of the Golds (film), a 1997 film adaptation of Jonathan Tolins's play
 Twilight of the Idols (disambiguation)
 Twilight of the Superheroes, a crossover storyline developed by Alan Moore
 Twilight of the Gods: Age of Revelation, a 2017 expandable mythology card game, designed by Chris Kluwe and published by Victory Point Games
 Twilight for the Gods, a 1958 film